1976 ACC tournament may refer to:

 1976 ACC men's basketball tournament
 1976 Atlantic Coast Conference baseball tournament